Dalla dognini is a species of butterfly in the family Hesperiidae. It is found in Ecuador.

References

Butterflies described in 1889
dognini
Hesperiidae of South America
Taxa named by Paul Mabille